Dracaena fragrans (cornstalk dracaena), is a flowering plant species that is native throughout tropical Africa, from Sudan south to Mozambique, west to Côte d'Ivoire and southwest to Angola, growing in upland regions at  altitude. It is also known as striped dracaena, compact dracaena, and corn plant.

Description

Dracaena fragrans is a slow growing shrub, usually multistemmed at the base, mature specimens reaching  or more tall with a narrow crown of usually slender erect branches. Stems may reach up to  diameter on old plants; in forest habitats they may become horizontal with erect side branches. Young plants have a single unbranched stem with a rosette of leaves until the growing tip flowers or is damaged, after which it branches, producing two or more new stems; thereafter, branching increases with subsequent flowering episodes.

The fruit is an orange-red berry  diameter, containing several seeds.

Cultivation

In Africa, D. fragrans is commonly grown as a hedge plant. It is suited to frost-free climates and USDA Hardiness zones 10-11. Elsewhere, it is primarily popular as a houseplant and valued for its tolerance of a wide range of indoor conditions, from bright indirect light, to bright shade (which brings out more variegation in certain hybrids) and even deep shade (where it will have a darker green color). It is also very tolerant of neglect. The NASA Clean Air Study indicated that the plant aided removal of indoor pollutants such as formaldehyde, xylene, and toluene. The plant is known as "masale" to the Chagga people of Tanzania, who regard it as holy.

In cultivation, in the Neotropics, a few generalist hummingbird species, like the sapphire-spangled emerald (Chionomesa lactea), visit the flowers.

Cultivars
Several cultivars have variegated foliage. 'Massangeana' (also commonly called "Mass Cane"), has a bright-yellow central stripe on the foliage. 'Compacta' is more compact and suitable for indoor cultivation, with smaller, flatter and slightly pointed leaves. Some of the most popular cultivars include 'Janet Craig', 'Lemon Lime', and 'Warneckei' ('Warneckii'), which are often sold under the synonym D. deremensis.

The cultivars 'Lemon Lime', ‘Massangeana’, and 'Warneckei' bear the Royal Horticultural Society's Award of Garden Merit.

Propagation
Signs of new root growth are usually indicated as new leaves emerging. Lateral, bushy stem growth (typically being two or three shoots) comes from old foliar scars, from the leaf “eyes” that are located growing up along the entire stem. Additionally, anywhere a cutting is made (at any point along the stem) is likely to be where new stems will form, where a leaf once grew.

Etymology and synonymy
The species name refers to the fragrant flowers, while the English name derives from a perceived resemblance of the stem to a corn (Zea mays) stalk. Synonyms include Aletris fragrans L. (basionym), Cordyline fragrans (L.) Planch., Pleomele fragrans (L.) Salisb., Sansevieria fragrans (L.) Jacq., Dracaena deremensis Engl., Dracaena smithii Hook.f., and Dracaena ugandensis Baker. Other English names include striped dracaena (for variegated cultivars), corn plant (for the cultivar 'Massangeana';), Chinese money tree, and fortune plant.

The plant is known as  - "bothal gas" (meaning "bottle tree") in Sinhala, in Sri Lanka.

References

External links

 

fragrans
Flora of Ethiopia
Flora of Sudan
Flora of Kenya
Flora of Tanzania
Flora of Uganda
Flora of Cameroon
Flora of the Central African Republic
Flora of Equatorial Guinea
Flora of Ghana
Flora of Guinea
Flora of Nigeria
Flora of Togo
Flora of Angola
Flora of Malawi
Flora of Mozambique
Flora of Zambia
Flora of Zimbabwe
House plants
Low light plants

pt:Dracaena